Claude Osmonde Barker (1897 – 1961) was an Australian politician. He was the Independent member for Irwin-Moore in the Western Australian Legislative Assembly from 18 March to 2 August 1939, when he resigned.

References

1897 births
1961 deaths
Independent members of the Parliament of Western Australia
Members of the Western Australian Legislative Assembly
Place of birth missing
20th-century Australian politicians